Woree State High School (WSHS) is a public school situated in the southern suburbs of Cairns, North Queensland, Australia. The school originally provided education from Year 8 to 12 but in 2015 began providing education to Year 7 as well and has around 750 students. It was opened in 1985. It has four sporting houses(Trojan, Gemini, Pindar & Apollo) which are named after types of sugar cane as a reminder of the history of the land.

History 
Woree SHS was built on an old Sugar Cane Farm, along with the surrounding suburbs and construction on the school was started in 1984, with the school opening in 1985. At the time of the school opening, there were only 5 buildings within the school (A,B,C,D Blocks), with construction continuing until 1989 when all but two blocks (H and Community Centre) were completed. In 1992, another block was added to WSHS (H Block) and in 2007 the Community Centre was completed.

Community 
The Woree State High School community is very multicultural, with many different cultural backgrounds. This is reflected in the many NAIDOC ceremonies, and at all formal events.

References 

https://woreeshs.eq.edu.au/Pages/default.aspx

Public high schools in Queensland
Schools in Cairns
Educational institutions established in 1985
1985 establishments in Australia